The 2016 Missouri State Treasurer election was held on November 8, 2016, to elect the State Treasurer of Missouri, concurrently with the 2016 U.S. presidential election, as well as elections to the United States Senate and elections to the United States House of Representatives and various state and local elections.

Incumbent Democratic State Treasurer Clint Zweifel was term-limited and could not run for re-election to a third term in office. Eric Schmitt (Republican) won the general election against his opponents Sean O'Toole (Libertarian), Judy Baker (Democrat), and Carol Hexem (Green).

Democratic primary

Candidates

Declared
 Judy Baker, former state representative, nominee for MO-09 in 2008 and candidate for lieutenant governor in 2012
 Pat Contreras, business consultant and former diplomat

Declined
 Mike Sanders, Jackson County Executive, former Jackson County prosecuting attorney and former chairman of the Missouri Democratic Party
 John Wright, former state representative

Endorsements

Polling

Results

Republican primary

Candidates

Declared
 Eric Schmitt, state senator

Withdrawn
 Dan W. Brown, state senator

Results

Libertarian primary

Candidates

Declared
 Sean O'Toole

Results

Green Party

Candidates

Declared
 Carol Hexem, businesswoman and former schoolteacher

General election

Polling

Endorsements

Results

See also
2016 Missouri gubernatorial election

References

External links
Official campaign websites (Archived)
Judy Baker for Treasurer (D)
Eric Schmitt for Treasurer (R)

State Treasurer
Missouri state treasurer elections
Missouri